Province of Trabzon or Province of Trebizond may refer to:

Province of Trabzon, one of the provinces of the Republic of Turkey
Eyalet of Trebizond, one of the eyalet of the Ottoman Empire
Vilayet of Trebizond, one of the vilayet of the Ottoman Empire